Robert Joseph Ogle  (1928–1998), known as Bob Ogle, was a Canadian Roman Catholic priest, broadcaster, and member of the House of Commons.

Early life and career
Ogle was born on 24 December 1928 in Rosetown, Saskatchewan, to the native Quebecers Henry Ogle and Annie Brennan. Devout Irish Catholics, his parents had him baptized the next day, on Christmas Day. He grew up in poverty on farms in Saskatchewan and was an altar boy, an air cadet, and a boy scout in his youth.

Ogle studied at St. Peter's Seminary in London, Ontario, from 1946 to 1953 and was ordained to the priesthood in May 1953. After ordination, he became a parish priest in Saskatoon, Saskatchewan, where he founded the Catholic Centre, and went on to be appointed rector of St. Pius X Seminary. He later received a Doctor of Canon Law degree from the University of Ottawa.

Political career and later life
Ogle was elected to the House of Commons as a New Democratic Party candidate for the Saskatchewan riding of Saskatoon East in the 1979 federal election.  He defeated the incumbent Member of Parliament, Otto Lang, the federal Minister of Justice, who had held the riding since 1968.  Ogle was re-elected in the 1980 election. He served as his party's critic for external affairs from 1981 to 1984. He did not stand again in 1984, following instructions from the Vatican, in conformity with the new Code of Canon Law.

He was the author of four books: 
Faculties of Military Chaplains (1957),
When the Snake Bites the Sun (1977),
North- South Calling (1986), and
A Man of Letters (1990).

In 1989, he was made an Officer of the Order of Canada for "his tireless efforts to foster Canada's understanding of her role in global progress". In 1995, he was awarded the Saskatchewan Order of Merit.

He died on 1 April 1998 in Saskatoon. The St. Pius X Seminary at the University of Saskatchewan was renamed Ogle Hall after his death.

References

Notes

Bibliography

Further reading

External links
 
 Saskatchewan Order of Merit citation
Robert Ogle fonds - Library and Archives Canada

1928 births
1998 deaths
20th-century Canadian male writers
20th-century Canadian writers
20th-century Canadian Roman Catholic priests
Canadian people of Irish descent
Candidates in the 1979 Canadian federal election
Candidates in the 1980 Canadian federal election
Members of the House of Commons of Canada from Saskatchewan
Members of the Saskatchewan Order of Merit
New Democratic Party MPs
Officers of the Order of Canada
People from Rosetown
Politicians from Saskatoon
Saskatchewan New Democratic Party politicians
University of Ottawa alumni
Writers from Saskatoon